Geoffrey Toovey (born 17 June 1969), also known by the nickname of "Toovs" or "Tooves",  is the former head coach of the Bradford Bulls and former professional rugby league footballer. Toovey played halfback for the Manly-Warringah Sea Eagles, then played as a  later in his career at the Northern Eagles. He played 286 first-grade matches in all, and captained Manly to the 1996 ARL premiership and the 1995 and 1997 grand finals. He played in 13 international matches for Australia between 1991 and 1998. Toovey is the former head coach of Manly-Warringah.

Early life
Toovey was educated at Davidson High School and played his junior rugby league for the Belrose Eagles, who participate in the Manly-Warringah/North Sydney District Rugby League district competition.

Representative and playing career
Toovey made his first grade debut for Manly-Warringah in round 10 1988 against Cronulla-Sutherland at Brookvale Oval.  Toovey played for Manly in subsequent finals campaigns in 1990, 1991 and 1994.

Toovey debuted for the New South Wales Blues in 1990, and was selected for the Australian team's end-of-season tour of Papua New Guinea in 1991 where he made his test debut for the Kangaroos, playing in all four games on tour including both tests against the Papua New Guinea Kumuls. 

During the 1995 season at the commencement of the Super League war, Toovey again played State of Origin for NSW, though the team suffered a 3-0 loss to Queensland who were coached by his former Manly team mate Paul Vautin. With the non-selection of Super League players, Toovey was recalled to the Australian team for the first time since 1991 in the 3-0 Trans-Tasman series win over New Zealand in 1995. At the end of the season in which Manly finished as minor premiers but beaten Grand Finalists, he was selected in the Australian squad for the 1995 Rugby League World Cup, playing in the Kangaroos 16-8 win over host nation England in the World Cup Final at Wembley Stadium. Although selected at halfback for the game, coach Bob Fulton only played Toovey in the position during scrums and utilised his speed off the mark by playing him at dummy half in general play with Andrew Johns (named at hooker) assuming the halfback role.

In the 1996 State of Origin series, Toovey and Johns continued with the now commonplace positional and role interchange they had used successfully in the World Cup.  Toovey captained Manly to the 1996 premiership after they defeated St. George in the grand final.  Toovey also won the Clive Churchill Medal after being man of the match.

In 1997, Toovey captained New South Wales to a State of Origin series victory and played a Test match against a Rest of the World side.  Manly would again finish as minor premiers for a third straight season in 1997.  Toovey played in the club's grand final defeat against the Newcastle Knights.

Toovey played with Manly-Warringah up until the end of the 1999 NRL season and played in what was at the time to be the club's last game as a stand-alone entity which came against St George in round 26 1999.  At the conclusion of the season, Manly controversially merged with arch rivals North Sydney to form the Northern Eagles as part of the NRL's rationalisation policy.

Toovey was the club's inaugural captain for the 2000 NRL season.  In 2000 he played at hooker in NSW's clean sweep against Queensland.  Toovey's final season as a player came during the 2001 NRL season.  His last game came in round 26 2001 against the Brisbane Broncos in which the Northern Eagles were defeated 42-14.

Captaincy
At the height of the Super League war, Toovey was honoured as Australian Test captain for the 1996 one-off Test against the Papua New Guinea Palais (the ARL loyalist side).

Post playing
Toovey retired at the end of 2001. He became an accountant by profession and a member of the board of the NRMA.

Coaching career
Toovey joined the Manly coaching staff when Des Hasler took over as coach in 2004 and in 2011 was appointed as Manly's head coach from the 2012 season, after Hasler first announced he would be moving to the Canterbury-Bankstown Bulldogs for the 2012 season.

Toovey's first competitive match in charge of the Sea Eagles was their defeat in the 2012 World Club Challenge.

In the 2012 Manly-Warringah Sea Eagles season, Toovey's first as an NRL head coach, the club came to within one game of the grand final but lost to Melbourne.

In the 2013 NRL season, Toovey guided Manly into the Grand Final against the Sydney Roosters. The Roosters ran out 26-18 winners. During the year, Toovey was fined 10,000 by the National Rugby League following his press-conference after Manly had lost their Round 23 game to South Sydney. Toovey had been unhappy with a number of refereeing decisions during the game, won 22-10 by the Rabbitohs, and had famously called for an investigation. In 2015, Manly sacked Toovey following a disappointing season and was replaced by Trent Barrett.

In January 2017, it was announced that Toovey would become the head coach of RFL Championship side Bradford Bulls, taking over from Rohan Smith following the liquidation and re-establishment of the club.

In 2022, Toovey was an assistant coach for the Samoa national rugby league team in the 2021 Rugby League World Cup.

References

Sources
 Whiticker, Alan (2004) Captaining the Kangaroos, New Holland, Sydney

External links
 Geoff Toovey at Silvertails.net

1969 births
Living people
Australia national rugby league team captains
Australia national rugby league team players
Australian accountants
Australian rugby league coaches
Bradford Bulls coaches
Clive Churchill Medal winners
Manly Warringah Sea Eagles captains
Manly Warringah Sea Eagles coaches
Manly Warringah Sea Eagles players
New South Wales City Origin rugby league team players
New South Wales Rugby League State of Origin captains
New South Wales Rugby League State of Origin players
Northern Eagles players
People educated at Davidson High School
Rugby league halfbacks
Rugby league hookers
Rugby league players from Sydney